Kana Kawakami (川上佳奈 Kawakami Kana, born August 20, 1984) is a Japanese volleyball player.

Profiles

2013 - Kana Kendziera

Clubs
BunkyoGakuin univ. Junior High → KyoeiGakuen High School → Aoyama Gakuin Univ. → ZEILER KOENIZ(Switzerland)→ (France?)

National team
 Junior national team (2002-2004)
 Universiade national team (2006-2009)

References

External links
JVA biography

Japanese women's volleyball players
Living people
1984 births